Thomas Gerull (born 2 January 1962) is a German fencer. He won a silver medal in the team épée event at the 1988 Summer Olympics.

References

External links
 

1962 births
Living people
German male fencers
Olympic fencers of West Germany
Fencers at the 1988 Summer Olympics
Olympic silver medalists for West Germany
Olympic medalists in fencing
People from Itzehoe
Medalists at the 1988 Summer Olympics
Sportspeople from Schleswig-Holstein